Katif, Qatif or Qateef may refer to the following:

Qatif, a region in Saudi Arabia
Katif (moshav), a former Israeli moshav in the Gaza Strip
Gush Katif, the largest former Israeli settlement bloc in the Gaza Strip